Card binders and 9-pocket pages are devices used to protect trading cards or game cards (such as collectible card games) from damage and to store them. Card binders typically use a 3-ring binder or a D-ring binder.

9-pocket page
A 9-pocket page, also called a 9-card page or a 9-card sleeve, is a 3x3 plastic page that holds 3 cards per row and per column. Other variations of this type of card pocket page exists. Additionally, some collectors prefer not to put more than one card in a pocket, as opposed to putting all duplicates in the same pocket (called a "double up"), or putting cards in backwards to be displayed on the reverse side of the page.

See also
Card sleeve
Singles, individual collectible cards

References

Card game terminology
Collectible card games
Trading cards